The 2000–01 Colorado Avalanche season was the franchise's 29th season, 22nd in the National Hockey League, and sixth as the Colorado Avalanche. The Avalanche won their second Stanley Cup by defeating the defending champion New Jersey Devils 4–3 in the Final. Ray Bourque would be the first and only NHL player to hoist the Stanley Cup prior to the team captain when Joe Sakic handed it to him out of respect for the future Hall of Famer in what proved to be his final game. 

This would be the last Stanley Cup title for the Avalanche until 2022.

Off-season

Regular season
October 14, 2000: In a victory over the expansion Columbus Blue Jackets, Patrick Roy tied Terry Sawchuk for most career wins by a goaltender.
October 17, 2000: In an overtime victory over the Washington Capitals, Patrick Roy broke Terry Sawchuk's record for most career wins by a goaltender.
October 20, 2000: A pre-game ceremony was held to honour Patrick Roy's 448th career victory. NHL Commissioner Gary Bettman presented Roy with a goalie stick dipped in silver. On the stick was engraved the name of every building he ever played in. The names of his children were also on the stick. Governor of Colorado Bill Owens proclaimed October 20 to 26 "Patrick Roy week" in the State of Colorado. Jerry Sawchuk, Terry's son, raised Patrick's arm in the air. The Avalanche defeated the Florida Panthers 5-1 in that game.
February 13, 2001: Patrick Roy made his first visit to Montreal since breaking Terry Sawchuk's record for most wins by a goaltender. Roy had won 289 games with the Montreal Canadiens, and the Canadiens held a pre-game ceremony for Roy. On that night, the Avalanche defeated the Canadiens in overtime 3-2.
March 24, 2001: Ray Bourque returned to Boston one last time as a player. This was also his first visit to Boston since being traded to the Avalanche. The Bruins fans gave Bourque a standing ovation as the Avalanche defeated the Bruins 4-2.

All-Star Game

The 51st National Hockey League All-Star Game took place on February 4, 2001, at Pepsi Center in Denver, Colorado. The final score was North America 14, World 12. The following are Colorado Avalanche representatives who took part in the all-star game.

Players

Goaltenders

Coaches/Personnel

Season standings

Schedule and results

Player statistics

Forwards
Note: GP = Games played; G = Goals; A = Assists; Pts = Points; PIM = Penalty minutes

Defensemen
Note: GP = Games played; G = Goals; A = Assists; Pts = Points; PIM = Penalty minutes

Goaltending
Note: GP = Games played; W = Wins; L = Losses; T = Ties; SO = Shutouts; GAA = Goals against average

The 2000–01 season marked the first and only time that Patrick Roy won at least 40 games in a season during his career.

Playoffs

Awards and records
Awards
 Presidents' Trophy: || Colorado Avalanche
 Clarence S. Campbell Bowl: || Colorado Avalanche
 Conn Smythe Trophy: || Patrick Roy, Colorado Avalanche
 Hart Memorial Trophy: || Joe Sakic, Colorado Avalanche
 King Clancy Memorial Trophy: || Shjon Podein, Colorado Avalanche
 Lady Byng Memorial Trophy: || Joe Sakic, Colorado Avalanche
 Lester B. Pearson Award: || Joe Sakic, Colorado Avalanche

Honors
 Joe Sakic, Center, NHL First All-Star Team
 Ray Bourque, Colorado Avalanche, Defense, NHL First All-Star Team
 Rob Blake, Defense, NHL Second All-Star Team

Franchise records
Most goals in a season: Joe Sakic, 54 (2000–01)
Most game-winning goals in a season: Joe Sakic, 12 (2000–01)
Most wins in a season: Patrick Roy, 40 (2000–01)

Transactions

Trades 
The Avalanche have been involved in the following transactions during the 2000–01 season.

Draft picks
Colorado's draft picks at the 2000 NHL Entry Draft held at the Pengrowth Saddledome in Calgary, Alberta.

References
 Avalanche on Hockey Database

Stanley Cup championship seasons
Presidents' Trophy seasons
Western Conference (NHL) championship seasons
Colorado
Colorado
Colorado Avalanche seasons
National Hockey League All-Star Game hosts
Col
Colorado Avalanche
Colorado Avalanche